Entertainment Desk was a Canadian entertainment news television series, which aired on the Global Television Network in the 1990s. Anchored by Bob McAdorey, the show aired weekday afternoons.

Entertainment news shows in Canada
Global Television Network original programming
Television series by Corus Entertainment